Star Awards 2019 (also SA25, Chinese: 红星大奖25) is a television award ceremony which is held in Singapore. Star Awards 2019 marks the 25th anniversary, or Silver Jubilee, of the Star Awards since it was first awarded in 1994, hence subtitled Star Awards 25. The theme for the ceremony is "The Moment", highlighting the best moments of the local television industries alongside Singapore's talents and audiences as well. This is also the first award ceremony to feature a vocalized version of the Awards' theme tune, titled 《星光》(lit. "Starlight").

The Walk Of Fame and Ceremony Awards was broadcast live on 14 April 2019. The Walk Of Fame will be followed by the Awards Ceremony. It was the first ceremony (and the first live special overall) to be live-streamed on Channel 8's YouTube channel.

Two dramas which received the top two highest nominations, Blessings 2 (eight) and A Million Dollar Dream (six), were tied with the most wins with three; Blessings 2 won the Best Drama Serial, Best Director and Young Talent Awards, while A Million Dollar Dream won three of four acting categories except Best Supporting Actress. No other drama or variety programs won multiple awards, as 12 programs won only one, five of which were from the drama category. This was also the first ceremony in Star Awards history both the Special Achievement and All-Time Favourite Artiste awards, an award replacing in-lieu of the former award, were presented on the same show.

A short series, 24 Milestones《回顾红星25》 (lit. Recap of Star Awards 25), was produced in commemoration to the celebration. A one-minute long highlight snippet was uploaded daily at midnight on Toggle, featuring the best moments of Star Awards starting from the debut year of 1994, from 20 March onwards, beginning a 24-day countdown towards the ceremony.

Programme details

Winners and nominees

Creative Achievement Awards 
On 28 March 2019, the Creative Achievement Awards was held at Level 9 of MediaCorp Campus to recognise the achievements of Mediacorp’s creative staff in the past year. The presentation were held outside the main Star Awards ceremony. 

The awards were hosted by Desmond Ng and Quan Yi Fong and was presented on Channel 8's Facebook page live. Tham Loke Kheng, CEO of MediaCorp, gave out the Awards to the recipients. 

Winners are listed first, highlighted in boldface.

Star Awards 
The Nominees were announced on 8 February 2019.

Winners are listed first, highlighted in boldface.

Special Awards 
The All-Time Favourite Artiste is a special achievement award given out to artiste(s) who have achieved a maximum of 10 popularity awards over 10 years.

Top 10 Most Popular Artistes 
Similar to last year's revision of format, a poll of 1,000 people representing a wide demographic across Singapore's population, conducted independently by an accredited market research company, will be used to identify the top 20 Male and Female artistes who will go on to the next round of public voting; this and the votes from telepoll and online voting as a measure of their fan support weighed 50% each.

The nominations were announced on 7 March 2019; the telepoll voting opened shortly at 3.00pm, while the Online voting opens a day later at 12.00pm. Voting closed on 14 April 2019, at 8.30pm, during the ceremony.

Multiple awards and nominations

Presenters and performers
Creative Achievement Awards Ceremony

Presenters

Lists of Presenters' names were announced on 3 April 2019.

Performers

Ceremony 
The show opens with a cold open containing references to nominations for Best Drama Serial starring Quan Yi Fong (first watching a video snippet from VIC), who time-traveled back to 1918 (referencing Blessings 2) and phone-calling three other characters (from Say Cheese, You Can Be An Angel 3 and A Million Dollar Dream, in order of appearance) before recalling how the main protagonist returning to her own time (by throwing a rock and sunk along with her) and arrived at the stage to begin the show. After the opening, Quan brought references from past ceremonies while asking celebrities (in order of appearance, 1994 (Hosts Chen Shucheng and Yvette Tsui, as well as Fann Wong and Christopher Lee's dialogues), 2014 (Quan tripped while making her way to receive her award) and 2015 (Jeanette Aw's fall before accepting her All-Time Favourite Artiste), followed by Marcus Chin parodying the Love 97.2FM's theme tune while asking whether any celebrities can recall the 1994 theme tune).

Changes to award categories 
The Best Short-form Drama Serial and Best Short-form Variety Programme were introduced this year to highlight short series (usually web series from Toggle) that have two or more episodes with a total running time of at least 150 minutes, and the series must tell a complete, non-recurring story, and not have an ongoing storyline or main characters from the actual series.

The Best Variety Special award returned after it was not presented last year.

Tribute to Aloysius Pang 
A segment was dedicated to Aloysius Pang who died during military training earlier on 23 January. The Honorary TV Award, an award presented to artistes posthumously, was not awarded to Pang. Producer Elaine See later explained that the decision for the Honorary TV Award was not "intentional" and it was different from the circumstances from Huang Wenyong, who had received nominations prior to his death.

Accolade
Star Awards 2019 won the Best Variety Special in the 2021 ceremony, making it the eighth win for the category.

References

External links
Official Website

Star Awards